This is a list of actors born, or active in the acting field, in Armenia.

(sorted alphabetically by surname)

Simon Abkarian
Marie Rose Abousefian
Petros Adamian
David Alpay
Nora Armani
Kay Armen
Grégoire Aslan
Serge Avedikian
Val Avery
Hovhannes Babakhanyan
Richard Bakalyan
Aracy Balabanian
Adrienne Barbeau
Pooja Bhatt
Eric Bogosian
Arthur Edmund Carewe
Cher
Rosa Gloria Chagoyán
Gregg Chillin
Mike Connors
Ken Davitian
Mariana Derderian
Armen Dzhigarkhanyan
Naz Edwards
Vilen Galstyan
Davit Gharibyan
Michael A. Goorjian
Sid Haig
David Hedison
Tulip Joshi
Dmitry Kharatyan
Andrea Martin
Amasi Martirosyan
Mher Mkrtchyan
Vladimir Msryan
Stepan Nercessian
Erik Palladino 
Vardan Petrosyan
Armen Margaryan
Michael Poghosyan
Osvaldo Ríos
Vahram Sahakian
Angela Sarafyan
Andy Serkis
Adam G. Sevani
Vic Tablian
Akim Tamiroff
Jano Toussounian
Michael Vartan
Dita Von Teese
Leonid Yengibarov

See also 

 Lists of actors
 List of Armenians

References

 
Armenia
Actors